Live at Nottingham Rock City is a live album by the British heavy metal band Tygers of Pan Tang, recorded in April 1981 and not released until 2001.

Track listing
 "Take It" - 4:36
 "Rock and Roll Man" - 2:42
 "Blackjack" - 3:00
 "Tyger Bay" - 3:26
 "Insanity" - 5:17
 "Euthanasia" - 3:52
 "Mirror" - 4:45
 "Wild Catz" - 3:08
 "Money" - 3:59
 "Don't Stop By" - 3:49
 "Gangland" - 3:52
 "Silver and Gold" - 3:25
 "Hellbound" - 3:52
 "Slave to Freedom" - 5:30
 "All or Nothing" - 3:12 (Small Faces cover)

Personnel
Band members
John Deverill - vocals
John Sykes - guitars
Robb Weir - guitars
Rocky - bass
Brian Dick - drums 

Production
Chris Tsangarides - engineer
Fred Purser - mixing

References

Tygers of Pan Tang albums
Live New Wave of British Heavy Metal albums
2001 live albums
Spitfire Records live albums